Live in San Francisco at the Palace of Fine Arts is an EP of the Canadian singer, songwriter, accordionist, harpist, and pianist, Loreena McKennitt. It was recorded live in San Francisco during a concert at the Palace of Fine Arts, on 19 May 1994 and released 1 year later.

Track listing
"The Mystic's Dream"  – 7:24
"Santiago"  – 5:24
"She Moved Through the Fair"  – 5:37
"Between the Shadows"  – 4:18
"The Lady of Shalott"  – 8:50
"The Bonny Swans"  – 6:56

Loreena McKennitt albums
1995 live albums
1995 EPs
Live EPs